This article contains information about the literary events and publications of 1500.

Events
December 31 – Figurae bibliae by Antonius Rampegollis is printed in Venice by Georgius Arrivabenus. This is generally accepted as the last of the end of incunables.
unknown date – John Skelton, tutor to Prince Henry (second son of King Henry VII of England, is referred to as "unum Britannicarum literarum lumen ac decus" in De Laudibus Britanniae, a Latin ode by Desiderius Erasmus,  .

New books

Prose
This is the Boke of Cokery (first known printed cookbook in English)
Hieronymus Brunschwygk – Liber de arte distillandi de simplicibus (Simple book on the art of distillation)
Desiderius Erasmus – Adagia (Paris)
Johannes Trithemius – Steganographia (approximate year)

Drama
The Wakefield Master – Second Shepherds' Play (approximate year)

Poetry

Beves of Hamtoun (approximate publication date, written c. 1300)
Geoffrey Chaucer (anonymously) – Mars and Venus (approximate date of publication)
Singiraja – Maha Basavaraja Charitra

Births
April 12 – Joachim Camerarius (the Elder), German classical scholar (died 1574)
April 23
Alexander Ales, Scottish-born religious controversialist (died 1565)
Johann Stumpf, Swiss historical and topographical writer (died 1576)
December 6 – Nicolaus Mameranus, Luxembourg soldier and Latin-language historian and poet (died c. 1567)
unknown dates
 Jeanne de la Font, French poet and culture patron (died 1553)
 Charles Dumoulin, French jurist (died 1566)
probable
 Johannes Aal, Swiss theologian and composer (died 1553)
Erasmus Alberus, German humanist, reformer and poet (died 1553)
Shlomo Halevi Alkabetz, Greek kabbalist and poet (died 1580)
Francisco de Moraes, Portuguese writer (died 1572)
Hayâlî, Ottoman Turkish poet (died 1557)
Nikolaus Herman, German hymnist (died 1561)
Pier Angelo Manzolli (Marcello Palingenio Stellato), Neapolitan Christian humanist poet (died before 1551)
Ludovico Pasquali, Dalmatian Italian poet (died 1551)
Wu Cheng'en, Chinese novelist (died 1582)

Deaths
April 10 – Michael Tarchaniota Marullus, Greek scholar, poet and soldier (born c. 1453; drowned)
June 23 – Lodovico Lazzarelli, Italian poet, philosopher, courtier and magician (born 1447)
August 9 – Janus Plousiadenos, Greek Renaissance scholar and hymn-writer (born c. 1429)
August 10 – Serafino dell'Aquila, Petrarchan poet (born 1466)
October 1 – John Alcock, bishop, politician and writer (born c.1430)
probable – Stefano Infessura, Italian humanist writer (born c. 1435)

References

 
1500
1500 books
Years of the 15th century in literature